Marie-Joseph-Guy-Henry-Philippe de Riquet de Caraman, 18th Prince de Chimay (9 October 1836, Château de Menars, France – 29 March 1892, Brussels, Belgium), was a Belgian diplomat and politician. He was notable as Ambassador to the Holy See (1846-1847), governor of the province of Hainaut (1870-1878) and Foreign Minister of Belgium (1884-1892).

Life
His parents were Joseph de Riquet de Caraman, 17th Prince de Chimay, and Émilie Pellapra. His own six children included Joseph, Prince de Caraman-Chimay, Prince Alexandre (who married Mathilde Stuyvesant), and Élisabeth (who married the Count of Greffulhe).

He also gave private concerts, with him on violin and his wife on piano. In memory of one of these at which he had assisted, Franz Liszt dedicated a mass to Caraman-Chimay

References

External links
https://web.archive.org/web/20161113015527/http://www.chateaudechimay.be/?page_id=761
 Joseph de Riquet de Caraman-Chimay in ODIS - Online Database for Intermediary Structures

Belgian diplomats
19th-century Belgian politicians
Ambassadors of Belgium to the Holy See
Joseph
1836 births
1892 deaths